Juan Romero is the name of:
 Juan Romero (bullfighter), Spanish bullfighter
 Juan Romero (judoka) (born 1988), Uruguayan judoka
 Juan Carlos Romero (politician) (born 1950), Argentine Justicialist Party politician
 Juan Carlos Romero (athlete) (born 1977), Mexican long-distance runner
 Juan Romero (19502018), subject of a photograph as the last person to shake Robert F. Kennedy's hand before he was assassinated in 1968
 Juan Carlos Romero (sport shooter) (born 1963), Guatemalan sport shooter
 Juan Pablo Romero (born 1990), Mexican boxer
 the subject of "The Transition of Juan Romero", a 1910 short story by American horror fiction writer H. P. Lovecraft